"Kahan Hai Tu" (Urdu: کہاں ہے تو, literal English translation: "where are you?") is a rock-influenced song single by the Pakistani rock band Entity Paradigm from their debut album, Irtiqa. The single was released in 2003, and is the third single from the band's debut album. The song is written by band members, Ahmed Ali Butt and Zulfiqar J. Khan.

The song is similar to "Hamein Aazma" as far as the beginning is concerned but then the track unfold its own unique blend of heavy guitar notes and drums.

Music video
The videos starts off with whole band walking and then the whole band is scene performing and head-banging at a concert. In the whole video the band is scene performing at a concert and in the end they're again seen walking.

Track listing
Kahan Hai Tu

External links
 Guitar Tabs for Entity Paradigm
 Official Website

2003 singles
Pakistani songs
Pakistani rock songs